The Men's K-4 1000m event at the 2010 South American Games was held over March 27 at 11:20.

Medalists

Results

References
Final

1000m K-4 Men